Nanpu Island is an island in Luopu Subdistrict, Panyu, Guangzhou, Guangdong, China. It is located at the south of Luoxi Island, the east of Chencun, Shunde, and the west and north of Dashi Town Centre. Its total area is about 10.7 square kilometres. Many fashionable residential estates, including Guangzhou Country Garden, are built in there. The island connects with Luoxi Island by Nanpu Bridge and Lijiang Bridge and Dashi Town Centre by Nanpu Dadao.

References

Panyu District
Islands of Guangzhou